Cecil Morris Smith (23 June 1927 – 24 April 1988) was a Progressive Conservative party member of the House of Commons of Canada. He was born in Treherne, Manitoba and became an auctioneer and public servant by career.

He was elected at the Churchill riding in
the 1974 general election and served one term in the 30th Canadian Parliament. Smith was defeated at the riding by Rodney Murphy of the New Democratic Party in the 1979 federal election, and again in the 1980 election.

Electoral history

External links
 

1927 births
1988 deaths
Members of the House of Commons of Canada from Manitoba
Progressive Conservative Party of Canada MPs
People from Central Plains Region, Manitoba
Canadian auctioneers